The Huangpu, formerly romanized as Whangpoo, is a  river flowing north through Shanghai. The Bund and Lujiazui are located along the Huangpu River.

The Huangpu is the biggest river in central Shanghai, with the Suzhou Creek being its major tributary.

Bridges
Fengpu Bridge
Lupu Bridge, opened 2003.
Minpu Bridge
Minpu Bridge No. 2
The lower deck of this bridge carries Line 5 across the Huangpu River.  This is the first line of the Shanghai Metro to cross the river via a bridge.
Nanpu Bridge, opened 1991.
Songpu Bridge, opened 1975 railway, 1976 highway.
Songpu Bridge No. 2
Songpu Bridge No. 3
Xupu Bridge, opened 1997.
Yangpu Bridge, opened 1993.

The following roadways, highways, and railways also cross the Huangpu River via a bridge:

G1503 Shanghai Ring Expressway
G50 Shanghai–Chongqing Expressway
G60 Shanghai–Kunming Expressway
Zhufeng Highway
Huqingping Highway
Shanghai–Hangzhou railway

Tunnels
A number lines of the Shanghai Metro cross underneath the river, including Line 12, Line 4, Line 2, Line 9, Line 4 (twice), Line 8, Line 13, and Line 11 (from north to south geographically).

There are several roadways which cross the Huangpu river via a tunnel, including:

Bund Sightseeing Tunnel
Dalian Road tunnel
Dapu Road tunnel
East Fuxing Road tunnel
East Yan'an Road tunnel
Jiangpu Road tunnel (planned)
Jungong Road tunnel
Longyao Road tunnel
Lujiabang Road tunnel (planned)
Luoxiu Road tunnel (planned)
Nenjiang Road tunnel (planned)
Outer Ring Road tunnel
Renmin Road tunnel
Shangzhong Road tunnel
South Hongmei Road tunnel
South Wanping Road tunnel (planned)
South Xizang Road tunnel
West Changjiang Road tunnel (under construction)
Xiangyin Road tunnel
Xinjian Road tunnel
Yinxing Road tunnel (planned)
Zhoujiazui Road tunnel (planned)

Ferries 

There are currently several ferry lines operated by Shanghai Ferry. Numerous tour boats also ply the harbour in the Pudong area.

Controversy 

In March 2013, some 16,000 pig carcasses were found floating in the Huangpu River in Shanghai. Some of the pigs carried ear tags saying they were from Jiaxing, so that city in Zhejiang may be the source; One news agency indicates that dead pigs are often dumped into rivers in China to avoid the disposal cost.

However local farmers deny the dumping allegation.

See also
Geography of China
List of rivers in China

References

Citations

General and cited references

External links 
 

Rivers of Shanghai
Tributaries of the Yangtze River